The Hell Diggers is a 1921 American silent drama film produced by Famous Players-Lasky and distributed through Paramount Pictures. The film was directed by Frank Urson from a short story, The Hell Diggers, by Byron Morgan. Wallace Reid and Lois Wilson star. Like most silent films of that time, it is in the public domain and is lost.

Cast
Wallace Reid as Teddy Darman
Lois Wilson as Dora Wade
Alexander Brown as John Wade
Frank Geldert as Calthorpe Masters
Lucien Littlefield as Silas Hoskins
Clarence Geldart as Silverby Rennie
Buddy Post as The Fat Farmer

See also
Wallace Reid filmography

References

External links

truck advertising The Hell Diggers

1921 films
American silent feature films
Lost American films
Films based on short fiction
1921 drama films
Silent American drama films
American black-and-white films
Films directed by Frank Urson
1921 lost films
Lost drama films
1920s American films